Abeer Rantisi  (born 12 July 1987) is a Jordanian former footballer who played as a midfielder for the Jordan women's national football team and was one of its original members. She competed with the team at the 2006 Asian Games. At the club level, she played for Orthodox in Jordan.

In 2014, Rantisi served as coach for the Asian Football Development Project, a non-profit that supports a number of football programs for refugees in the northern part of Jordan.

As of September 2015, Rantisi was the head  of women’s football for the Jordan Football Association.

References

1987 births
Living people
Jordanian women's footballers
Jordan women's international footballers
Place of birth missing (living people)
Women's association football defenders
Footballers at the 2006 Asian Games
Asian Games competitors for Jordan
Jordan Women's Football League players